The Stilwell Museum is a museum in Yuzhong District of Chongqing that which preserves the former residence of General Joseph W. Stilwell, the Allied Chief of Staff in the China Theater during World War II. It opened in 1994.

Background
During World War II General Joseph Stilwell, known to his men as "Vinegar Joe", was the Allied Chief of Staff in the China Theater of Operations. He arrived in Chongqing on March 4, 1942.  Stilwell was in charge of the United States' Lend-Lease policy with Chinese forces and had an acrimonious relationship with Kuomintang leader Chiang Kai-shek, who he derisively called "Peanut."
His low regard for Chiang, and positive words towards the Communist forces, contributed to his high standing in the People's Republic of China.

Description
Located in Stilwell's former residence and headquarters, the museum comprises a three-storied house furnished in 1940s style. In the courtyard there is an engraving of a speech by American President Franklin D. Roosevelt.

The building opened as a museum in 1994 and is run by the Chongqing Municipal Government. Financial support for the Museum is provided by the Joseph W. Stilwell Institute Foundation Ltd. a US tax-exempt foundation.
The Museum was renovated and reopened in March 2003. The renovation was funded by the Freeman Foundation in Vermont, USA.  Addition financial support is provided by Stilwell Innovation Enterprises and the Stilwell International Innovation Center.

See also
 List of museums in China

References

Yuzhong District
1991 establishments in China
Museums established in 1991
Museums in Chongqing
Biographical museums in China
Historic house museums in China
Houses in Chongqing
World War II museums in China
Major National Historical and Cultural Sites in Chongqing